The 1963–64 South-West Indian Ocean cyclone season was an average cyclone season.

Systems

Tropical Cyclone Amanda

Amanda existed from December 1 to December 14.

Moderate Tropical Storm Betty

Better existed from December 23 to December 28.

Severe Tropical Storm Christine

Christine existed from January 9 to January 16.

Tropical Cyclone Danielle

Danielle existed from January 15 to January 23. Over three days, the storm dropped heavy rainfall, reaching .

Moderate Tropical Storm Eileen

Eileen existed from January 29 to February 10.

Tropical Disturbance Frances

Frances existed from February 19 to February 23.

Intense Tropical Cyclone Giselle

Giselle existed from February 22 to March 4.

Four days' of rainfall, reaching  at Belouve, caused heavy flooding damage.

Moderate Tropical Storm Harriet

Harriet existed from March 4 to March 17.

Tropical Cyclone Ingrid

Ingrid existed from March 29 to April 3. It was monitored as Cyclone 30S by the Joint Typhoon Warning Center.

Moderate Tropical Storm Jose

Jose existed from April 29 to May 2.

Moderate Tropical Storm Karen

Karen existed from May 4 to May 10.

See also

 Atlantic hurricane seasons: 1963, 1964
 Eastern Pacific hurricane seasons: 1963, 1964
 Western Pacific typhoon seasons: 1963, 1964
 North Indian Ocean cyclone seasons: 1963, 1964

References

South-West Indian Ocean cyclone seasons